Events from the year 1751 in Russia

Incumbents
 Monarch – Elizabeth

Events

 Kamen-na-Obi

Births

Deaths

References

1751 in Russia
Years of the 18th century in the Russian Empire